Giovanni Toti (born 7 September 1968) is an Italian journalist and politician, who has been President of Liguria since June 2015. Toti was also elected to the European Parliament, following the 2014 European Parliament election.

Biography 
Born in Viareggio in 1968, Toti grew up in Massa Carrara where the family ran a hotel, and he has lived for many years with his family and parents in Bocca di Magra, Ameglia, in the province of La Spezia, Liguria. He graduated in political science from the University of Milan. He is married to the journalist Siria Magri.

During the 1980s he was a member of the youth wing of the Italian Socialist Party, led at the time by Bettino Craxi, Prime Minister from 1983 to 1987, later condemned for corruption, in the trial Mani Pulite.

In 1991, he started working for Studio Aperto, the news program of Silvio Berlusconi's TV channel Italia 1, of which he became director in 2010. In March 2012 Toti became also director of Tg4, replacing the long-time one Emilio Fede.

In January 2014, Toti entered politics as political counselor of Berlusconi's party Forza Italia. In the 2014 European elections he was elected to the European Parliament with 148,291 votes.

On 1 April 2015 he presented his candidacy to become President of Liguria in the regional election of May at the head of centre-right coalition composed of Northern League, Brothers of Italy, New Centre-Right and Toti's party FI. After the election, Toti was elected President with 34.4% of votes, defeating the Democratic candidate Raffaella Paita.

References 

1968 births
Forza Italia politicians
Presidents of Liguria
Living people
MEPs for Italy 2014–2019
21st-century Italian politicians